Doto dunnei is a species of sea slug, a nudibranch, a marine gastropod mollusc in the family Dotidae.

Distribution
This species was first described from Galway Bay, Ireland. It has subsequently been reported widely in Britain and Ireland. It is known to occur on the Mediterranean coast of Spain 

Description

This nudibranch is translucent white with dark red or black spots on the tips of the ceratal tubercles. Extra spots occur on the sides of the tubercles. The back and sides are spattered with red or brown pigment which extends up the inner faces of the rhinophore sheaths.

EcologyDoto dunnei feeds on the hydroid Kirchenpaueria pinnata''.

References

Dotidae
Gastropods described in 1976